Birkenes Church is a parish church of the Church of Norway in Birkenes Municipality in Agder county, Norway. It is the church for the Birkenes parish which is part of the Vest-Nedenes prosti (deanery) in the Diocese of Agder og Telemark. The white, wooden church was built in a cruciform design in 1858 using plans drawn up by the architect Christian Heinrich Grosch. The church seats about 650 people.

History
The earliest existing historical records of the church date back to the year 1344, but the church was not new that year, it was likely built in the 1100s. The first church on this site was a stone building that had a rectangular nave and a narrower, nearly square-shaped choir. Over the years, a wooden tower was added on the west end of the building. From 1660 to 1662, a new entry was constructed for the church and repairs to the tower were undertaken. During the 1680s, the church was whitewashed on the inside and outside. From 1723 until 1762, the church was sold into private ownership. In 1820, the tower was taken down and rebuilt. A sacristy was built in 1841. In 1858, the old church was torn down and a new wooden church was built on the same site. Some of the stone from its walls was reused in the foundation of a new church and to build stone walls surrounding the church cemetery. The new wooden church was consecrated on 1 December 1858 by the Bishop Jacob von der Lippe. In 1964, the zinc-covered tower was redone with a new copper roof. In 1987, the sacristy was enlarged to include a small kitchen.

Cemetery
The cemetery surrounds the church and it has been expanded several times. In 1888-1889, the main gate was moved from the west side to the east side, opposite the sacristy. There is also a gate on the south side. Starting in 1965, work was done to create a mortuary room under the sacristy. After much back and forth, a separate mortuary was built in 1970 using drawings by the architect Gabriel Tallaksen. In 1981, a tool house with a break room for cemetery workers was built as well.

Media gallery

See also
List of churches in Agder og Telemark

References

Birkenes
Churches in Agder
Wooden churches in Norway
Cruciform churches in Norway
19th-century Church of Norway church buildings
Churches completed in 1858
12th-century establishments in Norway